A Secret History of the IRA (Penguin, 2002; 2007) by journalist Ed Moloney.

Content

Reviews
Reviewers responded favorably. In The Blanket, an online journal, reviewer Liam O Ruairc described the book as potentially "the standard if not the definitive work on the history of the Provisional IRA". Eamonn McCann, in The Nation, commented that it was "the best book yet" written on the Provisional IRA as it traced the rise of the Provos from the burning out of Catholic neighborhoods in Belfast in August 1969 to "the enclosure of the movement's leadership within conventional bourgeois politics through the Good Friday Agreement of 1998" (Belfast Agreement).

A central theme in the book is the role that Sinn Féin President Gerry Adams has played in the Irish republican movement. In his review, O Ruairc noted that the book could have been "better titled A Secret History of Gerry Adams". In The Sunday Business Post Online, reviewer Tom McGurk, in a reference to the strategy articulated by Danny Morrison at the 1981 Sinn Féin Ard-Fheis, wrote that the book "grippingly" detailed Adams's struggle to move from the Armalite to the ballot box "without a split and without bodies in ditches".

The book was met with controversy because of some of the revelations it contains.  And those revelations reveal both a strength and weakness, in that some of Moloney's sources were willing to speak in great detail but with the caveat that they remain confidential.

References

External links
Reviews of A Secret History of the IRA

2002 non-fiction books
Irish non-fiction books
Provisional Irish Republican Army
Books about the Troubles (Northern Ireland)
Books about Northern Ireland